Rock and roll (often written as rock & roll, rock 'n' roll, or rock 'n roll) is a genre of popular music that evolved in the United States during the late 1940s and early 1950s. It originated from African-American music such as jazz, rhythm and blues, boogie woogie, gospel, jump blues, as well as country music. While rock and roll's formative elements can be heard in blues records from the 1920s and in country records of the 1930s, the genre did not acquire its name until 1954.

According to journalist Greg Kot, "rock and roll" refers to a style of popular music originating in the United States in the 1950s. By the mid-1960s, rock and roll had developed into "the more encompassing international style known as rock music, though the latter also continued to be known in many circles as rock and roll." For the purpose of differentiation, this article deals with the first definition.

In the earliest rock and roll styles, either the piano or saxophone was typically the lead instrument. These instruments were generally replaced or supplemented by guitar in the middle to late 1950s. The beat is essentially a dance rhythm with an accentuated backbeat, almost always provided by a snare drum. Classic rock and roll is usually played with one or two electric guitars (one lead, one rhythm) and a double bass (string bass). After the mid-1950s, electric bass guitars ("Fender bass") and drum kits became popular in classic rock.

Rock and roll had a polarizing influence on lifestyles, fashion, attitudes, and language. It is often portrayed in movies, fan magazines, and on television. Some people believe that the music had a positive influence on the civil rights movement, because both Black American and White American teenagers enjoyed it.

Terminology 

The term "rock and roll" is defined by Greg Kot in Encyclopædia Britannica as the music that originated in the mid-1950s and later developed "into the more encompassing international style known as rock music". The term is sometimes also used as synonymous with "rock music" and is defined as such in some dictionaries.

The phrase "rocking and rolling" originally described the movement of a ship on the ocean, but by the early 20th century was used both to describe the spiritual fervor of black church rituals and as a sexual analogy. A retired Welsh seaman named William Fender can be heard singing the phrase "rock and roll" when describing a sexual encounter in his performance of the traditional song "The Baffled Knight" to the folklorist James Madison Carpenter in the early 1930s, which he would have learned at sea in the 1800s; the recording can be heard on the Vaughan Williams Memorial Library website.

Various gospel, blues and swing recordings used the phrase before it became widely popular; it was used in 1940s recordings and reviews of what became known as "rhythm and blues" music aimed at a black audience.

In 1934, the song "Rock and Roll" by the Boswell Sisters appeared in the film Transatlantic Merry-Go-Round. In 1942, before the concept of rock and roll had been defined, Billboard magazine columnist Maurie Orodenker started to use the term to describe upbeat recordings such as "Rock Me" by Sister Rosetta Tharpe; her style on that recording was described as "rock-and-roll spiritual singing". By 1943, the "Rock and Roll Inn" in South Merchantville, New Jersey, was established as a music venue. In 1951, Cleveland, Ohio, disc jockey Alan Freed began playing this music style, and referring to it as "rock and roll" on his mainstream radio program, which popularized the phrase.

Several sources suggest that Freed found the term, used as a synonym for sexual intercourse, on the record "Sixty Minute Man" by Billy Ward and his Dominoes. The lyrics include the line, "I rock 'em, roll 'em all night long". Freed did not acknowledge the suggestion about that source in interviews, and explained the term as follows: "Rock ’n roll is really swing with a modern name. It began on the levees and plantations, took in folk songs, and features blues and rhythm".

In discussing Alan Freed's contribution to the genre, two significant sources emphasized the importance of African-American rhythm and blues. Greg Harris, then the Executive Director of the Rock n Roll Hall of Fame, offered this comment to CNN: "Freed's role in breaking down racial barriers in U.S. pop culture in the 1950s, by leading white and black kids to listen to the same music, put the radio personality 'at the vanguard' and made him 'a really important figure. After Freed was honored with a star on the Hollywood Walk of Fame, the organization's Web site offered this comment: "He became internationally known for promoting African-American rhythm and blues music on the radio in the United States and Europe under the name of rock and roll".

Not often acknowledged in the history of rock and roll, Todd Storz, the owner of radio station KOWH in Omaha, Nebraska, was the first to adopt the Top 40 format (in 1953), playing only the most popular records in rotation. His station, and the numerous others which adopted the concept, helped to promote the genre: by the mid 50s, the playlist included artists such as "Presley, Lewis, Haley, Berry and Domino".

Early rock and roll

Origins 

The origins of rock and roll have been fiercely debated by commentators and historians of music. There is general agreement that it arose in the Southern United States – a region that would produce most of the major early rock and roll acts – through the meeting of various influences that embodied a merging of the African musical tradition with European instrumentation. The migration of many former slaves and their descendants to major urban centers such as St. Louis, Memphis, New York City, Detroit, Chicago, Cleveland, and Buffalo meant that black and white residents were living in close proximity in larger numbers than ever before, and as a result heard each other's music and even began to emulate each other's fashions. Radio stations that made white and black forms of music available to both groups, the development and spread of the gramophone record, and African-American musical styles such as jazz and swing which were taken up by white musicians, aided this process of "cultural collision".

The immediate roots of rock and roll lay in the rhythm and blues, then called "race music", in combination with either boogie-woogie and shouting gospel or with country music of the 1940s and 1950s. Particularly significant influences were jazz, blues, gospel, country, and folk. Commentators differ in their views of which of these forms were most important and the degree to which the new music was a re-branding of African-American rhythm and blues for a white market, or a new hybrid of black and white forms.
 
Contradicting Larry Birnbaum, the author of Before Elvis: The Prehistory of Rock 'n' Roll, and not withstanding early forms of white rock and roll then called "country boogie", musicologist and rock music historian author of Race Records, Rock Music Forbidden on U.S. Radio 1942-1955 Bruno Blum argues that early, fully-formed rock and roll music really surged in America at least as early as 1945 but was segregated, therefore not available to the general public and widely undocumented. According to Blum it was nevertheless truly rock, thus ought not be called "prehistory," basing his comments on existing records including Rock Woogie by Jim Wynn’s Bobalibans (1945), Rockin' the House by Memphis Slim and the House Rockers (1946), Aladdin Boogie by Amos Milburn (1947), Rock and Rye by Jimmy McCracklin (1947), We're Gonna Rock (1947) and Rock and Roll(1948) by Wild Bill Moore, and many others:

"For most lovers of the genre, rock sprang up with Bill Haley and Elvis Presley in 1954-1956. But why would rock be called “rock” when played by Whites and “rhythm and blues” when it was played by Blacks? According to the usual clichés, rock’s roots lie deep in a muddled amalgam where “blues” and “rhythm and blues” were necessarily mixed with “country music” in order to be dubbed “rock” and thereby gain entrance to history and legend — the official history, that is. Yet African-American rock anticipated Bill Haley’s first isolated hit Rock The Joint (1952) by a long way, as shown by its rare original version (by Jimmy Preston in 1948) included here. This “black” rock would discreetly coexist with the first white rock hits. But there is still a clear tendency to relegate African-American rock to the genre’s “Prehistory”, which would be to say that it is NOT part of the genre. Consequently, and despite their landmark recordings, Tiny Bradshaw, Wynonie Harris, Roy Brown, Smiley Lewis and others have been literally erased from our memories, leaving the official title of “pioneers” to the subsequent generation—Eddie Cochran, Elvis and their like — even though they appeared only five or ten years later. Two black artists still appear amongst the official inventors of rock, however: the undisputed giants named Little Richard and Chuck Berry, who had both started singing and playing in the very early 1950s. But African-American hits like Saturday Night Fish Fry by Louis Jordan, with its electric guitar and “it was rocking” chorus in 1949, would still be seen as something like the work of prehistoric men who were ineligible for the “rock” hall of fame. […] if you admit that the contribution of Euro-American music (not forgetting Hawaiian music), along with bluegrass, Irish popular songs, Cajun music and others, did much to enrich the history of white rock and rockabilly in particular, and while the interaction between “black” and “white” musicians was often the norm, including in the blues domain, the fact remains that the fundamental matrix of the rock genre is African-American. When they added country guitars, it was rockabilly that Bill Haley, Sam Phillips and his creature Elvis Presley invented (in 1951-1954), not rock, which was something they tried to assimilate by recording versions of black pieces like “Rocket 88” by Jackie Brenston or “Good Rockin’ Tonight” by Roy Brown, whose original version had appeared in 1947. Depending on the DJ, tempo, rhythm and style of the period, the era’s names for this music were “jazz” (We Love to Boogie by Freddy Strong with Dizzy Gillespie and John Coltrane), “swing” (It Rocks! It Rocks! It Swings! by The Treniers) or “boogie woogie” (Rock Woogie by Jim Wynn in 1945). Like boogie, “shuffle” music had arrived as early as the late thirties (Rock This Morning by James Allen & James Gilchrist).
The music was also called “blues” (My Baby Left Me by Arthur Crudup), “rhythm music” (Hambone by Red Saunders), “rhythm and blues”6 (Honey Hush by Big Joe Turner), “R&B” (the abbreviation of “rhythm and blues” and the name given to “black” music styles in the charts of Billboard magazine post-summer 1949), “jump blues” (Rock Around the Clock by Hal Singer), “big beat”, “rock ‘n’ roll” or “race music”, was the label used by the press and Billboard in particular."

In the 1930s, jazz, and particularly swing, both in urban-based dance bands and blues-influenced country swing (Jimmie Rodgers, Moon Mullican and other similar singers), were among the first music to present African-American sounds for a predominantly white audience. One particularly noteworthy example of a jazz song with recognizably rock and roll elements is Big Joe Turner with pianist Pete Johnson's 1939 single "Roll 'Em Pete", which is regarded as an important precursor of rock and roll. The 1940s saw the increased use of blaring horns (including saxophones), shouted lyrics and boogie-woogie beats in jazz-based music. During and immediately after World War II, with shortages of fuel and limitations on audiences and available personnel, large jazz bands were less economical and tended to be replaced by smaller combos, using guitars, bass and drums. In the same period, particularly on the West Coast and in the Midwest, the development of jump blues, with its guitar riffs, prominent beats and shouted lyrics, prefigured many later developments. In the documentary film Hail! Hail! Rock 'n' Roll, Keith Richards proposes that Chuck Berry developed his brand of rock and roll by transposing the familiar two-note lead line of jump blues piano directly to the electric guitar, creating what is instantly recognizable as rock guitar. This proposal by Richards neglects the black guitarists who did the same thing before Berry, such as Goree Carter, Gatemouth Brown, and the originator of the style, T-Bone Walker. Country boogie and Chicago electric blues supplied many of the elements that would be seen as characteristic of rock and roll. Inspired by electric blues, Chuck Berry introduced an aggressive guitar sound to rock and roll, and established the electric guitar as its centerpiece, adapting his rock band instrumentation from the basic blues band instrumentation of a lead guitar, second chord instrument, bass and drums. In 2017, Robert Christgau declared that "Chuck Berry did in fact invent rock 'n' roll", explaining that this artist "came the closest of any single figure to being the one who put all the essential pieces together".

Rock and roll arrived at a time of considerable technological change, soon after the development of the electric guitar, amplifier and microphone, and the 45 rpm record. There were also changes in the record industry, with the rise of independent labels like Atlantic, Sun and Chess servicing niche audiences and a similar rise of radio stations that played their music. It was the realization that relatively affluent white teenagers were listening to this music that led to the development of what was to be defined as rock and roll as a distinct genre. Because the development of rock and roll was an evolutionary process, no single record can be identified as unambiguously "the first" rock and roll record. Contenders for the title of "first rock and roll record" include Sister Rosetta Tharpe's "Strange Things Happening Every Day" (1944), "That's All Right" by Arthur Crudup (1946),  "Move It On Over" by Hank Williams (1947), "The Fat Man" by Fats Domino (1949), Goree Carter's "Rock Awhile" (1949), and Jimmy Preston's "Rock the Joint" (1949) (later covered by Bill Haley & His Comets in 1952), 

"Rocket 88" by Jackie Brenston and his Delta Cats (Ike Turner and his band The Kings of Rhythm and sung by Brenston), was recorded by Sam Phillips in March 1951. This is often cited as the first rock n' roll record. In an interview however, Ike Turner offered this comment: "I don't think that ‘Rocket 88’ is rock ‘n’ roll. I think that ‘Rocket 88’ is R&B, but I think ‘Rocket 88’ is the cause of rock and roll existing".

In terms of its wide cultural impact across society in the US and elsewhere, Bill Haley's "Rock Around the Clock", recorded in April 1954 but not a commercial success until the following year, is generally recognized as an important milestone, but it was preceded by many recordings from earlier decades in which elements of rock and roll can be clearly discerned. 

Journalist Alexis Petridis argued that neither Haley's "Rock Around the Clock" nor Presley's version of "That's Alright Mama" heralded a new genre: "They were simply the first white artists' interpretations of a sound already well-established by black musicians almost a decade before. It was a raucous, driving, unnamed variant of rhythm and blues that came complete with lyrics that talked about rocking".

Other artists with early rock and roll hits included Chuck Berry, Bo Diddley, Little Richard, Jerry Lee Lewis, and Gene Vincent. Chuck Berry's 1955 classic "Maybellene" in particular features a distorted electric guitar solo with warm overtones created by his small valve amplifier. However, the use of distortion was predated by electric blues guitarists such as Joe Hill Louis, Guitar Slim, Willie Johnson of Howlin' Wolf's band, and Pat Hare; the latter two also made use of distorted power chords in the early 1950s. Also in 1955, Bo Diddley introduced the "Bo Diddley beat" and a unique electric guitar style, influenced by African and Afro-Cuban music and in turn influencing many later artists.

Rhythm and blues
Rock and roll was strongly influenced by R&B, according to many sources, including an article in the Wall Street Journal in 1985 titled, "Rock! It's Still Rhythm and Blues". In fact, the author stated that the "two terms were used interchangeably", until about 1957. The other sources quoted in the article said that rock and roll combined R&B with pop and country music.

Fats Domino was one of the biggest stars of rock and roll in the early 1950s and he was not convinced that this was a new genre. In 1957, he said: "What they call rock 'n' roll now is rhythm and blues. I’ve been playing it for 15 years in New Orleans". According to Rolling Stone, "this is a valid statement ... all Fifties rockers, black and white, country born and city-bred, were fundamentally influenced by R&B, the black popular music of the late Forties and early Fifties".  Further, Little Richard built his ground-breaking sound of the same era with an uptempo blend of boogie-woogie, New Orleans rhythm and blues, and the soul and fervor of gospel music vocalization.

Less frequently cited as an influencer, LaVern Baker was inducted into the Rock and Roll Hall of Fame in 1991. The Hall remarked that her "fiery fusion of blues, jazz and R&B showcased her alluring vocals and set the stage for the rock and roll surge of the Fifties".

Rockabilly 

"Rockabilly" usually (but not exclusively) refers to the type of rock and roll music which was played and recorded in the mid-1950s primarily by white singers such as Elvis Presley, Carl Perkins, Johnny Cash, and Jerry Lee Lewis, who drew mainly on the country roots of the music. Presley was greatly influenced by and incorporated his style of music with that of some of the greatest Black musicians like BB King, Arthur Crudup and Fats Domino. His style of music combined with black influences created controversy during a turbulent time in history. Many other popular rock and roll singers of the time, such as Fats Domino and Little Richard, came out of the black rhythm and blues tradition, making the music attractive to white audiences, and are not usually classed as "rockabilly".

Presley popularized rock and roll on a wider scale than any other single performer and by 1956, he had emerged as the singing sensation of the nation.

Bill Flagg who is a Connecticut resident, began referring to his mix of hillbilly and rock 'n' roll music as rockabilly around 1953.

In July 1954, Presley recorded the regional hit "That's All Right" at Sam Phillips' Sun Studio in Memphis. Three months earlier, on April 12, 1954, Bill Haley & His Comets recorded "Rock Around the Clock". Although only a minor hit when first released, when used in the opening sequence of the movie Blackboard Jungle a year later, it set the rock and roll boom in motion. The song became one of the biggest hits in history, and frenzied teens flocked to see Haley and the Comets perform it, causing riots in some cities. "Rock Around the Clock" was a breakthrough for both the group and for all of rock and roll music. If everything that came before laid the groundwork, "Rock Around the Clock" introduced the music to a global audience.

In 1956, the arrival of rockabilly was underlined by the success of songs like "Folsom Prison Blues" by Johnny Cash, "Blue Suede Shoes" by Perkins, and the No. 1 hit "Heartbreak Hotel" by Presley. For a few years it became the most commercially successful form of rock and roll. Later rockabilly acts, particularly performing songwriters like Buddy Holly, would be a major influence on British Invasion acts and particularly on the song writing of the Beatles and through them on the nature of later rock music.

Doo wop 

Doo-wop was one of the most popular forms of 1950s rhythm and blues, often compared with rock and roll, with an emphasis on multi-part vocal harmonies and meaningless backing lyrics (from which the genre later gained its name), which were usually supported with light instrumentation. Its origins were in African-American vocal groups of the 1930s and 40s, such as the Ink Spots and the Mills Brothers, who had enjoyed considerable commercial success with arrangements based on close harmonies. They were followed by 1940s R&B vocal acts such as the Orioles, the Ravens and the Clovers, who injected a strong element of traditional gospel and, increasingly, the energy of jump blues. By 1954, as rock and roll was beginning to emerge, a number of similar acts began to cross over from the R&B charts to mainstream success, often with added honking brass and saxophone, with the Crows, the Penguins, the El Dorados and the Turbans all scoring major hits. Despite the subsequent explosion in records from doo wop acts in the later 1950s, many failed to chart or were one-hit wonders. Exceptions included the Platters, with songs including "The Great Pretender" (1955) and the Coasters with humorous songs like "Yakety Yak" (1958), both of which ranked among the most successful rock and roll acts of the era. Towards the end of the decade there were increasing numbers Italian-American singers taking up doo wop, creating groups like the Mystics and Dion and the Belmonts, and racially integrated groups like the Del-Vikings and the Impalas soon emerged. Doo-wop would be a major influence on vocal surf music, soul and early Merseybeat, including the Beatles.

Cover versions 

Many of the earliest white rock and roll hits were covers or partial re-writes of earlier black rhythm and blues or blues songs. Through the late 1940s and early 1950s, R&B music had been gaining a stronger beat and a wilder style, with artists such as Fats Domino and Johnny Otis speeding up the tempos and increasing the backbeat to great popularity on the juke joint circuit. Before the efforts of Freed and others, black music was taboo on many white-owned radio outlets, but artists and producers quickly recognized the potential of rock and roll. Some of Presley's early recordings were covers of black rhythm and blues or blues songs, such as "That's All Right" (a countrified arrangement of a blues number), "Baby Let's Play House", "Lawdy Miss Clawdy", and "Hound Dog". The racial lines, however, are rather more clouded by the fact that some of these R&B songs originally recorded by black artists had been written by white songwriters, such as the team of Jerry Leiber and Mike Stoller. Songwriting credits were often unreliable; many publishers, record executives, and even managers (both white and black) would insert their name as a composer in order to collect royalty checks.

Covers were customary in the music industry at the time; it was made particularly easy by the compulsory license provision of United States copyright law (still in effect). One of the first relevant successful covers was Wynonie Harris's transformation of Roy Brown's 1947 original jump blues hit "Good Rocking Tonight" into a more showy rocker and the Louis Prima rocker "Oh Babe" in 1950, as well as Amos Milburn's cover of what may have been the first white rock and roll record, Hardrock Gunter's "Birmingham Bounce" in 1949. The most notable trend, however, was white pop covers of black R&B numbers. The more familiar sound of these covers may have been more palatable to white audiences, there may have been an element of prejudice, but labels aimed at the white market also had much better distribution networks and were generally much more profitable. Famously, Pat Boone recorded sanitized versions of songs recorded by the likes of Fats Domino, Little Richard, the Flamingos and Ivory Joe Hunter. Later, as those songs became popular, the original artists' recordings received radio play as well.

The cover versions were not necessarily straightforward imitations. For example, Bill Haley's incompletely bowdlerized cover of "Shake, Rattle and Roll" transformed Big Joe Turner's humorous and racy tale of adult love into an energetic teen dance number, while Georgia Gibbs replaced Etta James's tough, sarcastic vocal in "Roll With Me, Henry" (covered as "Dance With Me, Henry") with a perkier vocal more appropriate for an audience unfamiliar with the song to which James's song was an answer, Hank Ballard's "Work With Me, Annie". Presley's rock and roll version of "Hound Dog", taken mainly from a version recorded by the pop band Freddie Bell and the Bellboys, was very different from the blues shouter that Big Mama Thornton had recorded four years earlier. Other white artists who recorded cover versions of rhythm and blues songs included Gale Storm (Smiley Lewis' "I Hear You Knockin), the Diamonds (The Gladiolas' "Little Darlin and Frankie Lymon & the Teenagers' "Why Do Fools Fall in Love?"), the Crew Cuts (the Chords' "Sh-Boom" and Nappy Brown's "Don't Be Angry"), the Fountain Sisters (The Jewels' "Hearts of Stone") and the Maguire Sisters (The Moonglows' "Sincerely").

Decline 

Some commentators have suggested a decline of rock and roll in the late 1950s and early 1960s. The retirement of Little Richard to become a preacher (October 1957), the departure of Presley for service in the United States Army (March 1958), the scandal surrounding Jerry Lee Lewis' marriage to his thirteen-year-old cousin (May 1958), the deaths of Buddy Holly, The Big Bopper and Ritchie Valens in a plane crash (February 1959), the breaking of the Payola scandal implicating major figures, including Alan Freed, in bribery and corruption in promoting individual acts or songs (November 1959), the arrest of Chuck Berry (December 1959), and the death of Eddie Cochran in a car crash (April 1960) gave a sense that the initial phase of rock and roll had come to an end.

During the late 1950s and early 1960s, the rawer sounds of Presley, Gene Vincent, Jerry Lee Lewis and Buddy Holly were commercially superseded by a more polished, commercial style of rock and roll.  Marketing frequently emphasized the physical looks of the artist rather than the music, contributing to the successful careers of Ricky Nelson, Tommy Sands, Bobby Vee and the Philadelphia trio of Bobby Rydell, Frankie Avalon, Fabian,  and Del Shannon, who all became "teen idols".

Some music historians have also pointed to important and innovative developments that built on rock and roll in this period, including multitrack recording, developed by Les Paul, the electronic treatment of sound by such innovators as Joe Meek, and the "Wall of Sound" productions of Phil Spector, continued desegregation of the charts, the rise of surf music, garage rock and the Twist dance craze. Surf rock in particular, noted for the use of reverb-drenched guitars, became one of the most popular forms of American rock of the 1960s.

British rock and roll 

In the 1950s, Britain was well placed to receive American rock and roll music and culture. It shared a common language, had been exposed to American culture through the stationing of troops in the country, and shared many social developments, including the emergence of distinct youth sub-cultures, which in Britain included the Teddy Boys and the rockers. Trad jazz became popular in the UK, and many of its musicians were influenced by related American styles, including boogie woogie and the blues. The skiffle craze, led by Lonnie Donegan, utilised amateurish versions of American folk songs and encouraged many of the subsequent generation of rock and roll, folk, R&B and beat musicians to start performing. At the same time British audiences were beginning to encounter American rock and roll, initially through films including Blackboard Jungle (1955) and Rock Around the Clock (1956). Both movies featured the Bill Haley & His Comets hit "Rock Around the Clock", which first entered the British charts in early 1955 – four months before it reached the US pop charts – topped the British charts later that year and again in 1956, and helped identify rock and roll with teenage delinquency.

The initial response of the British music industry was to attempt to produce copies of American records, recorded with session musicians and often fronted by teen idols. More grassroots British rock and rollers soon began to appear, including Wee Willie Harris and Tommy Steele. During this period American Rock and Roll remained dominant; however, in 1958 Britain produced its first "authentic" rock and roll song and star, when Cliff Richard reached number 2 in the charts with "Move It". At the same time, TV shows such as Six-Five Special and Oh Boy! promoted the careers of British rock and rollers like Marty Wilde and Adam Faith. Cliff Richard and his backing band, the Shadows, were the most successful home grown rock and roll based acts of the era. Other leading acts included Billy Fury, Joe Brown, and Johnny Kidd & the Pirates, whose 1960 hit song "Shakin' All Over" became a rock and roll standard.

As interest in rock and roll was beginning to subside in America in the late 1950s and early 1960s, it was taken up by groups in major British urban centers like Liverpool, Manchester, Birmingham, and London. About the same time, a British blues scene developed, initially led by purist blues followers such as Alexis Korner and Cyril Davies who were directly inspired by American musicians such as Robert Johnson, Muddy Waters and Howlin' Wolf. Many groups moved towards the beat music of rock and roll and rhythm and blues from skiffle, like the Quarrymen who became the Beatles, producing a form of rock and roll revivalism that carried them and many other groups to national success from about 1963 and to international success from 1964, known in America as the British Invasion. Groups that followed the Beatles included the beat-influenced Freddie and the Dreamers, Wayne Fontana and the Mindbenders, Herman's Hermits and the Dave Clark Five. Early British rhythm and blues groups with more blues influences include the Animals, the Rolling Stones, and the Yardbirds.

Cultural influence 

Rock and roll influenced lifestyles, fashion, attitudes, and language. In addition, rock and roll may have contributed to the civil rights movement because both African-American and white American teens enjoyed the music.

Many early rock and roll songs dealt with issues of cars, school, dating, and clothing. The lyrics of rock and roll songs described events and conflicts to which most listeners could relate through personal experience. Topics such as sex that had generally been considered taboo began to appear in rock and roll lyrics. This new music tried to break boundaries and express emotions that people were actually feeling but had not discussed openly. An awakening began to take place in American youth culture.

Race 
In the crossover of African-American "race music" to a growing white youth audience, the popularization of rock and roll involved both black performers reaching a white audience and white musicians performing African-American music. Rock and roll appeared at a time when racial tensions in the United States were entering a new phase, with the beginnings of the civil rights movement for desegregation, leading to the U.S. Supreme Court ruling that abolished the policy of "separate but equal" in 1954, but leaving a policy which would be extremely difficult to enforce in parts of the United States. The coming together of white youth audiences and black music in rock and roll inevitably provoked strong white racist reactions within the US, with many whites condemning its breaking down of barriers based on color. Many observers saw rock and roll as heralding the way for desegregation, in creating a new form of music that encouraged racial cooperation and shared experience. Many authors have argued that early rock and roll was instrumental in the way both white and black teenagers identified themselves.

Teen culture 

Several rock historians have claimed that rock and roll was one of the first music genres to define an age group. It gave teenagers a sense of belonging, even when they were alone. Rock and roll is often identified with the emergence of teen culture among the first baby boomer generation, who had greater relative affluence and leisure time and adopted rock and roll as part of a distinct subculture. This involved not just music, absorbed via radio, record buying, jukeboxes and TV programs like American Bandstand, but also extended to film, clothes, hair, cars and motorcycles, and distinctive language. The youth culture exemplified by rock and roll was a recurring source of concern for older generations, who worried about juvenile delinquency and social rebellion, particularly because, to a large extent, rock and roll culture was shared by different racial and social groups.

In America, that concern was conveyed even in youth cultural artifacts such as comic books. In "There's No Romance in Rock and Roll" from True Life Romance (1956), a defiant teen dates a rock and roll-loving boy but drops him for one who likes traditional adult music—to her parents' relief. In Britain, where postwar prosperity was more limited, rock and roll culture became attached to the pre-existing Teddy Boy movement, largely working class in origin, and eventually to the rockers. "On the white side of the deeply segregated music market", rock and roll became marketed for teenagers, as in Dion and the Belmonts' "A Teenager in Love" (1959).

Dance styles 
From its early 1950s beginnings through the early 1960s, rock and roll spawned new dance crazes including the twist. Teenagers found the syncopated backbeat rhythm especially suited to reviving Big Band-era jitterbug dancing. Sock hops, school and church gym dances, and home basement dance parties became the rage, and American teens watched Dick Clark's American Bandstand to keep up on the latest dance and fashion styles. From the mid-1960s on, as "rock and roll" was rebranded as  "rock," later dance genres followed, leading to funk, disco, house, techno, and hip hop.

References

Sources 

 Rock and Roll: A Social History, by Paul Friedlander (1996), Westview Press
 "The Rock Window: A Way of Understanding Rock Music" by Paul Friedlander, in Tracking: Popular Music Studies , Volume I, number 1, Spring, 1988
 The Rolling Stone Encyclopedia of Rock & Roll by Holly George-Warren, Patricia Romanowski, Jon Pareles (2001), Fireside Press
 The Sound of the City: the Rise of Rock and Roll, by Charlie Gillett (1970), E.P. Dutton
 
 The Fifties by David Halberstam (1996), Random House
 The Rolling Stone Illustrated History of Rock and Roll : The Definitive History of the Most Important Artists and Their Music by editors James Henke, Holly George-Warren, Anthony Decurtis, Jim Miller (1992), Random House

External links 

 
 The Camp Meeting Jubilee 1910 recording
 The Smithsonian's history of the electric guitar
 History of Rock
 Youngtown Rock and Roll Museum – Omemee, Ontario
 Eddie Cochran's Guitars

 
African-American culture
African-American music
American styles of music
American rock music genres
Culture of the Southern United States
1950s fads and trends
Popular music
Radio formats
Rock music
Youth culture in the United States
Youth culture in the United Kingdom
1950s neologisms
Italian-American culture